The 2018 CWL Pro League was a Call of Duty: WWII tournament on PlayStation 4 that occurred on January 23-July 29, 2018.

Format
The 2018 CWL Global Pro League consisted of 2 Stages, with 16 teams from North America, Europe and the APAC region participating. The 16 teams were split into 2 different Divisions with the top 4 teams from each Division advancing to playoffs. The top 6 teams from each pool advanced to Stage 2, while the bottom 2 teams from each Division have to go to the relegation playoffs.

Stage 1
A total of $700,000 prize money will be given out during Stage 1. All 16 teams will receive $12,500 for participating while the 8 teams which qualified for playoffs will play for another $500,000.

Calendar

Division A

Week 1 of Division A took place from January 23, 2018, until February 1, 2018, with week 2 taking place from February 20, 2018, until March 1, 2018.

Division B

Week 1 of Division B took place from February 6, 2018, until February 15, 2018, with week 2 taking place from March 14, 2018, until March 22, 2018.

Playoffs final standings

Relegation
The 4 bottom teams from Stage 1 participated in the relegation tournament against 4 other teams in a double-elimination bracket for the final 4 spots in Stage 2.

Participating teams:

  Mindfreak (Division A #7)
  Team Vitality (Division A #8)
  Evil Geniuses (Division B #7)
  Epsilon eSports (Division B #8)
  EZG eSports (North America Qualifier #1) 
  GGEA Orange (North America Qualifier #2) 
  Nordic (Europe Qualifier #1) 
  Tainted Minds (APAC Qualifier winner)

Roster Changes
Teams which placed among the bottom 2 teams in their Division during Stage 1 have until 6pm ET on April 13, 2018, to submit a roster and were allowed to replace 2 players.

Final standings
The top 4 teams qualified for Stage 2 of the 2018 CWL Pro League.

Stage 2
AA total of $700,000 prize money will be given out during Stage 2. All 16 teams will receive $12,500 for participating while the 8 teams which qualified for playoffs will play for another $500,000. The top 6 teams from all Stage 1 groups and the 4 teams which qualified via the relegation tournament participated in Stage 2. All 16 teams also qualified for the 2018 Call of Duty Championship.

Participating teams:

  Rise Nation (Division A #1)
  OpTic Gaming (Division A #2)
  Red Reserve (Division A #3)
  Team Kaliber (Division A #4)
  Echo Fox (Division A #5)
  compLexity Gaming (Division A #6)
  FaZe Clan (Division B #1)
  Luminosity Gaming (Division B #2)
  Team EnVyUs (Division B #3)
   (Division B #4)
  UNILAD (Division B #5)
  Splyce (Division B #6)
  Mindfreak (Relegation 1st)
  Evil Geniuses (Relegation 2nd)
  Epsilon eSports (Relegation 3rd)
  Tainted Minds (Relegation 4th)

Roster Changes
Teams which placed among the top 6 teams in their Division during Stage 1 have until 6pm ET on May 7, 2018, to submit a roster and were allowed to replace 2 players. Teams which placed among the bottom 2 teams in their Division during Stage 1 have until 6pm ET on April 13, 2018, to submit a roster and were allowed to replace 2 players.

Calendar

Division A

Division B

Playoffs qualified teams

Playoffs Bracket

Playoffs final standings

References

2018 in Los Angeles
2018 in sports in California
2018 first-person shooter tournaments
Call of Duty competitions
Major League Gaming competitions